Triptorelin, sold under the brand name Decapeptyl among others, is a medication that acts as an agonist analog of gonadotropin-releasing hormone, repressing expression of luteinizing hormone (LH) and follicle-stimulating hormone (FSH).

It is a decapeptide (pGlu-His-Trp-Ser-Tyr-D-Trp-Leu-Arg-Pro-Gly-NH2) and a gonadotropin-releasing hormone agonist (GnRH agonist) used as the acetate or pamoate salts.

Primary indications include endometriosis, for the reduction of uterine fibroids, to treat prostate cancer, and to treat male hypersexuality with severe sexual deviation. The drug has also been used off label to delay puberty in patients with gender dysphoria.

It was patented in 1975 and approved for medical use in 1986. It is on the World Health Organization's List of Essential Medicines.

Medical uses
Triptorelin is used to treat prostate cancer as part of androgen deprivation therapy.

Another common use in the United Kingdom is for hormone replacement therapy to suppress testosterone or estrogen levels in transgender people (in conjunction with estradiol valerate for trans women or testosterone for trans men). Spironolactone and cyproterone acetate are other drugs used by trans people to suppress sex hormones, but these drugs have a completely different mechanism of action. It can also be used as a puberty blocker.

Triptorelin has been used as a chemical castration agent for reducing sexual urges in sex offenders.

Drug action 
Triptorelin is a gonadorelin analogue, also known as luteinizing hormone releasing analogue (GnRH analogue, LHRH analogue). The drug binds to receptors in the pituitary gland and stimulates secretion of gonadotropins (namely luteinizing hormone LH and follicle-stimulating hormone FSH). This causes an initial phase of LH and FSH stimulation, prior to down-regulation of the gonadotrophin-releasing hormone receptors, thereby reducing the release of gonadotropins in the long term, which in turn leads to the inhibition of androgen and estrogen production.

Side-effects 
General side effects can include:

 Anaphylaxis
 Arthralgia
 Asthenia
 Asthma
 Breast tenderness (males and females)
 Changes in blood pressure
 Changes in breast size
 Depression
 Ovarian cysts
 Mood changes
 Skin rashes
 Hot flushes
 Weight changes

Society and culture

Brand names
Triptorelin is marketed under the brand names Decapeptyl (Ipsen) and Diphereline and Gonapeptyl (Ferring Pharmaceuticals). In the United States, it is sold by Watson Pharmaceuticals as Trelstar  and by Arbor Pharmaceuticals as Triptodur (an extended-release 6-month depot injection). In Iran, triptorelin is marketed under the brand name Variopeptyl. In the UK and Germany, it is sold as Salvacyl.

Research
Triptorelin and other antiandrogens may be effective in the treatment of obsessive–compulsive disorder.

References

Further reading

External links 
 

GnRH agonists
Peptides
Puberty blockers
AbbVie brands
World Health Organization essential medicines